Ehrling is a Swedish surname. Notable people with the name include:

 Cecilia Ehrling (born 1984), Swedish competitive dancer
 Marie Ehrling (born 1955), Swedish executive
 Sixten Ehrling (1918–2005), Swedish music conductor
 Harald Ehrling (born 1995), Swedish music producer and saxophonist

See also
 Ehrling's lemma, equivalence of certain norms on Sobolev spaces

Swedish-language surnames